Chris O'Hara is an American football coach who is the quarterbacks coach for the Minnesota Vikings.

Coaching career

Early Coaching Career
O'Hara began his coaching career as a student assistant at Temple. He followed Al Golden to Miami in 2011 and worked as a student assistant there for two years. The next season he continued to work at Miami this time as a graduate assistant.

Jaguars (first stint)
O'Hara then made the jump to the NFL in 2014 becoming an offensive coaching associate for the Jaguars in 2014 where he would stay until 2016.

Redskins
From 2017 until 2019 he worked as an offensive assistant for the Washington Redskins.

Jaguars (second stint)
In 2020 he worked as an offensive assistant for the Jaguars. He was fired after the 2020 season.

Rams
In 2021, he worked as an offensive assistant for the Rams where he won a Super Bowl.

Vikings
In 2022 he became the quarterbacks coach for the Minnesota Vikings.

References

1990 births
Living people
People from Swoyersville, Pennsylvania
Miami Hurricanes football coaches
Jacksonville Jaguars coaches
Washington Redskins coaches
Los Angeles Rams coaches
Minnesota Vikings coaches